Andrew Ritchie (born 23 February 1956 in Bellshill) is a Scottish retired professional footballer.

Career at Morton
As a teenager Ritchie had trials with Manchester United, Coventry City, Everton, Middlesbrough and Rangers, but chose to join Celtic in 1971, aged 15. Soon after, Ritchie was 'farmed' out to Junior team Kirkintilloch Rob Roy. At Celtic, Ritchie had numerous disagreements with manager Jock Stein, which led to his transfer to Morton. As part of the transfer, Morton goalkeeper Roy Baines joined Celtic in exchange for Ritchie and a payment of £10,000.

Ritchie is most famous for his seven years at Greenock side Morton, during which he scored 118 goals. He was revered by the club's fans and earned the nicknames 'the King of Cappielow Park' and 'The Idle Idol'.

He made his debut for Morton on 28 October 1976 and scored 133 goals in 246 games for the club. He was the top scorer in the Premier Division in 1978/79.

Ritchie was famous for what, by the standard of most professional footballers, was a rotund build and apparently blase demeanour. Scottish football journalist Chick Young saw Ritchie as "the epitome of the Scottish footballer – a fat, lazy bastard, but with great ball skill". He was renowned in Scotland for his expertise in free-kicks, reputedly perfected by observing Brazil train for the 1974 World Cup. His signature, demonstrated in more than one competitive match, was the ability to bend the ball into the net from a corner kick. His best and most famous goal was scored against Aberdeen at Cappielow Park.

In a famous incident Ritchie almost broke his leg falling over Greenock Telegraph photographer, Jim Sinclair, after he failed to stop on a long run up the field.

Whilst at Morton, Ritchie won a solitary cap for the Scotland national under-21 football team as an overage player, against Belgium.

Career after Morton
Ritchie was transferred from Morton to Motherwell in 1983. He was player-manager for Albion Rovers in season 1984–85. He retired in 1985, aged 28. Later, he took up a coaching/scouting role for Celtic and subsequent scouting roles for Aston Villa and Manchester City. He became an official SPL match observer
A biography, "The King of Cappielow" was published on 11 October 2008. A more warts and all account of Ritchie's life appeared in 'Flawed Genius; Scottish Football's Self Destructive Mavericks' (Birlinn 2009).

Awards
Ritchie received the Scottish Football Writers' Association Footballer of the Year award in 1979. In common with the rest of his teammates at Scottish Premier Division club Greenock Morton, he was a part-time footballer. On the day of the award ceremony Ritchie worked a shift in his other job laying tar as a road surfacer.

In 2005, he was voted 'cult hero' in an internet poll for the BBC television's Football Focus programme, receiving 64% of votes cast for Morton players.

Quotes
Some quotes from the book Greenock Morton 1874–1999 by Vincent P Gillen

"Andy Ritchie – I can close my eyes and see the day as clear as you like. Morton were getting a doing by Dundee Utd and the defence was under siege. Big Andy was standing at the centre circle, hands inside his shirt sleeves, looking at the seagulls, bored out of his skull, when Davie Hayes blootered the ball out – it was just Andy and Paul Hegarty left, and Andy, you couldn't slip a copy of the Greenock Telegraph under his feet when he jumped.

Hegarty jumped and missed and Ritchie did what Pelé couldn't do and volleyed the ball past Hamish from the half way line!

"Big Andy was always full of the verbal – always had a smile on his face, especially when he nutmegged you. I think in fact with the goal he scored in the Scottish Cup, players were always that terrified of Andy nutmegging them that they would shut their legs and he curled it roon them, you know.

He had such a good footballing brain that he sussed things like that. He had scored the one from 50 yards and he was in his own half, nobody near him and he shouted "Big Yin, ye'd better pick me up, I'll probably score from here" – you're talking 60–70 yards and I was thinking, he's got a point, I better get across. He was the scourge of the Dons in those days." – Alex McLeish

"Ritchie came at the right time – he was the cream at the top of the cake at the time...he got the label of being a lazy player and he nurtured that a little bit... I used to train him on his own, he trained hard. He was a character, his skills were unbelievable, his passing, his vision, his dead ball situations.. there was a free kick at a preseason game, we had a wee thing with Watford at the time... and they came about three seasons in a row. I can always remember this one game, Andy had a free kick just over the centre circle...they don't put a wall up or anything and Mick (Jackson) says, it was his first game, "He's not going to shoot from there", just leave him I says, he hits the ball in the roof of the net...he was that good" – Benny Rooney

References

External links

 

1956 births
Albion Rovers F.C. managers
Albion Rovers F.C. players
Celtic F.C. players
Clydebank F.C. (1965) players
East Stirlingshire F.C. players
Greenock Morton F.C. non-playing staff
Greenock Morton F.C. players
Kirkintilloch Rob Roy F.C. players
Living people
Motherwell F.C. players
Scotland under-21 international footballers
Scottish Football League managers
Scottish Football League players
Scottish Football League representative players
Scottish football managers
Scottish footballers
Footballers from Bellshill
Scottish league football top scorers
Association football forwards